Ernst Gerspach (24 April 1897 – 16 February 1974) was a Swiss athlete. He competed in the men's decathlon at the 1920 Summer Olympics and the 1924 Summer Olympics.

References

1897 births
1974 deaths
Athletes (track and field) at the 1920 Summer Olympics
Athletes (track and field) at the 1924 Summer Olympics
Swiss decathletes
Olympic athletes of Switzerland
Place of birth missing
Olympic decathletes